Alikhan, also romanised as Alihan or Elihan, is a masculine given name among traditionally Muslim ethnicities in the former Soviet Union, and a surname found in Pakistan and India. It is derived the name Ali and the suffix Khan.

People with this given name include:
Alikhan Bukeikhanov (1866–1937), Kazakh statesman
Elihan Tore (1884–1976), president of the Second East Turkestan Republic
Alihan Samedov (born 1964), Azerbaijani traditional musician
Alikhan Ramazanov (born 1976), Russian football defender and midfielder (Russian Premier League)
Alikhan Shavayev (born 1993), Russian football midfielder (Russian Premier League)

People with this surname include:
Rehan Alikhan (born 1962), English cricketer of Pakistani descent
Arif Alikhan (born 1968), American government official of Pakistani descent

See also
Ali Khan (disambiguation)

Azerbaijani masculine given names
Kazakh masculine given names